The 1998 Supercupa României was the third edition of Romania's season opener cup competition. The match was played in Bucharest at Stadionul Naţional on 9 September 1998, and was contested between Divizia A title holders, Steaua București and Cupa României champions, Rapid București. The winner was Steaua București.

External links
Romania – List of Super Cup Finals, RSSSF.com

1998 in association football
Supercupa României
FC Steaua București matches
FC Rapid București matches